The Sandown 500 (formally known as the Penrite Oil Sandown 500) is an annual endurance motor race which is staged at the Sandown Raceway, near Melbourne, Victoria, Australia from 1964. The event's name, distance – and the category of cars competing in it – has varied widely throughout its history. Most recently, the event was held as a championship event for Supercars from 2003 to 2007 and from 2012 to 2019.

Historically the event was held in September, the month before Australia's premier endurance race, the Bathurst 1000. However in its final running to date in 2019, it was held in November.

The event will return in 2023 after a three-year hiatus in September.

History

Production car era
The first two races were open to production based sedans and, at six hours duration, were substantially longer than later iterations of the race. Both races were won by an Alfa Romeo Giulia entered by Alec Mildren Racing. In 1965, Sandown also hosted the single-event Australian Touring Car Championship and hosted a regular sprint round from 1970 onwards. In 1968, after a two-year hiatus, the event was revived as a three-hour race and took on a long time role as an unofficial "warm-up" event for what was then the Bathurst 500. In common with the Bathurst race, it utilised technical regulations which limited cars to near production specifications, unlike the Australian Touring Car Championship which was for more highly modified Group C Improved Production Touring Cars. Manufacturers took a stronger interest in the race in this period and the Ford works team led by Canadian driver Allan Moffat won the 1969 race in a Ford XW Falcon GTHO Phase I, the first of six wins for Moffat. From 1970 the event's distance went from three hours to 250 miles, with Colin Bond driving a Holden LJ Torana GTR XU-1 to victory in 1971 and John Goss winning the last Series Production 500 in 1972 in a Ford XY Falcon GTHO Phase III.

Group C Touring Car era
The race was contested by the newly introduced Group C Touring Car category from 1973, while from 1976 the event became known as the Sandown 400, held over 400 kilometres, despite only being scheduled for 338 kilometres in 1980 and 1982. During the Group C era, the event was dominated by Peter Brock who won nine of the twelve races, six with the Holden Dealer Team. The other three races were won by Allan Moffat. The 1982 race was the first Sandown endurance race since 1965 to be won by a make other than a Ford or Holden, Moffat scoring the first of two consecutive wins in a Mazda RX-7. His 1982 victory came after he was disqualified, then re-instated after a pit lane infringement penalty was removed post-race. With the Sandown circuit being upgraded and lengthened from 3.1 km to 3.9 km in mid-1984, the race was increased from 400 km to 500 km. Peter Brock and Larry Perkins won the 1984 race in a Holden VK Commodore. It was Brock's record 9th and last win in the Sandown Enduro.

Group A Touring Car era
Group C was replaced by Australian regulations based on International Group A Touring Car rules in 1985. Jim Richards and Tony Longhurst won the first Group A race for driving a BMW 635 CSi, before George Fury scored a pair of victories in turbocharged Nissan Skylines with Glenn Seton in 1986 and Terry Shiel in 1987. The 1986 race was the first time a turbo powered car had won the Sandown enduro. Moffat claimed his sixth and final victory in 1988 in a Ford Sierra RS500 with former Grand Prix motorcyclist Gregg Hansford (the race would also prove to be Moffat's final race win in Australia). In a return to the original circuit layout, Nissan won again in 1989 with Jim Richards and Mark Skaife, before Seton and Fury took repeated their 1986 success with a win in Seton's Ford Sierra in 1990. The team of Mark Gibbs and Rohan Onslow driving a privateer Nissan GT-R had the biggest win of their careers in 1991. A slim entry of Group A cars in 1991 saw race organisers bring production cars back to the race as additional entries running in their own class, as they would in 1992, 1993 and 1994. A class for cars complying with the 1993 Group 3A 5.0 Litre Touring Car regulations, later to become known as V8 Supercars, was also included in the 1992 race. The 1992 Sandown 500 featured a memorable late race duel between Larry Perkins in his Group A Holden VL Commodore and Tony Longhurst in his BMW M3 in changeable weather, with Perkins holding on for his second Sandown win and the only win for his co-driver Steve Harrington.

Group 3A Touring Car era
The Group 3A 5.0 Litre Touring Cars regulations were adopted for the 500 in 1993 and Glenn Seton Racing's second entry, driven by David Parsons and Geoff Brabham won a race of high attrition. 1994 saw Dick Johnson's breakthrough win in the one race he had not been able to win in almost 20 years. He and John Bowe backed it up with a second win in 1995. The Holden Racing Team then scored consecutive wins with Craig Lowndes and Greg Murphy, including a memorable duel with Glenn Seton in 1997. Larry Perkins claimed his third win in 1998 with Russell Ingall before V8 Supercars, as it was then known, decided to look for other opportunities for their 500 km race.

Nations Cup era
The second hiatus in the history of the race commenced in 1999 when a Queensland government-supported bid saw the Sandown 500 replaced on the Supercars calendar by the Queensland 500, held at Queensland Raceway. The Sandown 500 was revived in 2001, returning to its roots as a race for production cars. With regulations linked to those of the Australian Nations Cup Championship, (a championship for GT style cars), and the Australian GT Production Car Championship, the race featured a more exotic variety of cars than it had traditionally attracted. John Bowe took his third Sandown win in 2001 in a Ferrari, and a Lamborghini driven by multiple Australian Drivers' Champion Paul Stokell won in 2002.

V8 Supercars era
By 2003, new owners of Queensland Raceway had tired of the relative expense of the 500 kilometre endurance race format, resulting in the Sandown 500 again being contested by V8 Supercars. By 2003, the 500 kilometre event, as well as the Bathurst 1000, was also included as a points-paying event within each V8 Supercars season, which meant that the circuit's sprint event dropped off the championship for the first extended period since the 1960s.

The 2003 race, which featured a mid-race hail storm, was also notable for a late race battle between Mark Skaife and Jason Richards in wet conditions. On the penultimate lap, Richards attempted to pass Skaife for the lead at Turn 9, but ended up bogged in the gravel trap and out of the race. Skaife also toured the gravel trap but was able to rejoin the track and went on to win. The 2004, 2005 and 2006 races saw the debut championship event wins in the category for Greg Ritter, Yvan Muller and Mark Winterbottom respectively. In 2007, Lowndes won the event for the fourth time, with Jamie Whincup. Lowndes and Whincup would go on to become the first pairing to win the Sandown 500 and Bathurst 1000 in the same year since Lowndes and Murphy in 1996.

After a change of promoter of Sandown Raceway's motorsport activities, a changed V8 Supercars calendar resulted in the 500 kilometre event moving to the Phillip Island Grand Prix Circuit for the 2008 season, while Sandown reverted to hosting a sprint round, an event which became known as the Sandown Challenge.

Australian Manufacturers' Championship
The Sandown 500 was revived in 2011 as a round of the Australian Manufacturers' Championship. It was split into two legs, run on Saturday and Sunday, with the overall placings based on the combined results of the two legs. The semi-factory supported Mitsubishi entry of Stuart Kostera and Ian Tulloch claimed the win in their Mitsubishi Lancer Evolution.

Return of Supercars

The Sandown 500 returned to the V8 Supercars calendar in 2012, replacing the Phillip Island 500 to again become the traditional lead-in race to the Bathurst 1000. The format used at the Phillip Island 500 from 2008 to 2012 was brought to Sandown, with two short races on Saturday used to set the grid. Each co-driver has to drive one of the two races. From 2013, the event became part of the newly formed Pirtek Enduro Cup within the Supercars season, along with the series' other two-driver races, the Bathurst 1000 and Gold Coast 600. Triple Eight Race Engineering dominated on the return to the track, with wins from 2012 to 2014. 2015 saw Winterbottom win the Sandown 500 for a second time, having first tasted success in 2006, leading home a Prodrive Racing Australia one-two finish.

From 2016 onwards, the newly-renamed Supercars Championship promoted the event as a "retro round", with several teams adopting one-off liveries for the event. The idea was loosely inspired by NASCAR's Bojangles' 500, that since 2015 has become a "retro round". The race itself saw Garth Tander, driving with 2012 winner Warren Luff, win his first Sandown 500 in mixed conditions, holding off Shane van Gisbergen by under half a second. The race was shortened by 18 laps following a first lap crash involving James Golding that damaged the turn 6 tyre barrier which needed to be repaired. The 2017 event was again shortened due to a lap one crash at turn 6, this time involving Taz Douglas. Cameron Waters and Richie Stanaway won the race, the first race victories of both of their Supercars careers. In 2018, Triple Eight Race Engineering dominated the event, scoring a clean sweep of the three podium positions, led by Whincup and Paul Dumbrell who won their third Sandown 500 together.

The 2019 event was scheduled in November, resulting in no lead-in endurance event to the Bathurst 1000, while the Saturday grid races became official championship points-paying races. It was also announced in the months leading up to the event that the Sandown 500 would not return in 2020, to be replaced by The Bend 500 at The Bend Motorsport Park. Sandown is scheduled to remain on the calendar with the return of the circuit's sprint event. At the final scheduled running of the event, Triple Eight, who had dropped to two entrants in 2019, were on track for another one-two finish before a mechanical failure while leading took the van Gisbergen/Tander entry, who had started from second last on the grid, out of contention. Whincup inherited the lead and won the race with Craig Lowndes, a repeat of their 2007 win together and their fifth and sixth wins of the race respectively. Meanwhile, after being relegated to last position on the grid for a technical infringement dating back to the 2019 Bathurst 1000, Scott McLaughin secured the 2019 Supercars Championship with a round to spare with a ninth place finish driving with Alexandre Prémat.

List of winners

Notes
  – Despite the event's name, the race was only scheduled for 338 kilometres due to broadcasting constraints.
  – Race was stopped before full race distance.
  – The .05 (pronounced "point-oh-five") in the event name for 1989 was part of a Government campaign targeting drink-driving; 0.05% is the legal blood alcohol content limit in Australia.

Records and statistics

Multiple winners

By driver

By entrant

By manufacturer

Most pole positions

Most podiums

Event sponsors
 1968–69: Datsun
 1976–81: Hang Ten
 1982–87: Castrol
 1988: Enzed
 1989: .05
 1991–92: Don't Drink Drive
 1996–98: Tickford
 2001: Clarion
 2003–05: Betta Electrical
 2007: Just Car Insurance
 2011: Dial Before You Dig
 2012: Dick Smith
 2013–17: Wilson Security
 2018: RABBLE.club
 2019, 2023–: Penrite Oil

See also
 Sandown SuperSprint
 List of Australian Touring Car Championship races

References

External links
  2017 Sandown 500 Official event website

Supercars Championship races
Motorsport at Sandown
Touring car races
Auto races in Australia
Recurring sporting events established in 1964
1964 establishments in Australia
Endurance motor racing